RuvABC (Recombination UV) is a complex of three proteins that mediate branch migration and resolve the Holliday junction created during homologous recombination in bacteria.  As such, RuvABC is critical to bacterial DNA repair.

RuvA and RuvB bind to the four strand DNA structure formed in the Holliday junction intermediate, and migrate the strands through each other, using a putative spooling mechanism. The RuvAB complex can carry out DNA helicase activity, which helps unwind the duplex DNA. The binding of the RuvC protein to the RuvAB complex is thought to cleave the DNA strands, thereby resolving the Holliday junction.

RuvA is a DNA-binding protein that binds Holliday junctions with high affinity. The structure of the complex has been variously elucidated through X-ray crystallography and EM data, and suggest that the complex consists of either one or two RuvA tetramers, with charge lined grooves through which the incoming DNA is channelled. The structure also showed the presence of so-called 'acidic pins' in the centre of the tetramer, which serve to separate the DNA duplexes. Its crystal structure has been solved at 1.9A.

RuvB is an ATPase that is only active in the presence of DNA and compared to RuvA, RuvB has a low affinity for DNA. The RuvB proteins are thought to form hexameric rings on the exit points of the newly formed DNA duplexes, and it is proposed that they 'spool' the emerging DNA through the RuvA tetramer.

RuvC is the resolvase, which cleaves the Holliday junction. RuvC proteins have been shown to form dimers in solution and its structure has been solved at 2.5A. It is thought to bind either on the open, DNA exposed face of a single RuvA tetramer, or to replace one of the two tetramers. Binding is proposed to be mediated by an unstructured loop on RuvC, which becomes structured on binding RuvA. RuvC can be bound to the complex in either orientation, therefore resolving Holliday junctions in either a horizontal or vertical manner.

See also
RecBCD

References

Further reading
 
 
Eggleston AK, Mitchell AH, and West SC (1997). “In Vitro Reconstitution of the Late Steps of Genetic Recombination in E. coli”. Cell. 89: 607–617.

External links
 

Proteins